Gorkha Rashtriya Congress (GRC) is a political party spearheading the unification of Darjeeling and Dooars with Sikkim.

D.K. Bomzan was the founding president of this party. After his death on 7 October 2010, Nima Lama became the new president.

In September 2010, GRC filed an RTI with the Sikkim government regarding the ownership of the territory under Darjeeling district. A seminar "Sikkim-Darjeeling Merger" was jointly organized by GRC and Sikkim Janashakti Party at Darjeeling in September 2010, which was attended by All India Gorkha League and Matri Bhumi Surakhsa Sangathan.

References

Political parties in West Bengal
Politics of Darjeeling district
Organizations with year of establishment missing